Coquine is a restaurant located in the Mount Tabor neighborhood of Portland, Oregon.  The restaurant serves French-inspired food made from ingredients purchased from local farms as well as Stumptown Coffee.

History
Co-owner Katy Millard was born in Rhodesia to an American father and Portuguese mother, but the family left during the uprising when the country became Zimbabwe, settling in Mobile, Alabama. As a child, she would make six-hour pasta dishes with her father. Later, Millard worked in restaurants in Mobile and in East Lansing, Michigan. After finishing college, Millard decided to spend two months backpacking Europe. On the trip, her father took her to the Guy Savoy restaurant, where she had a meal that "changed her life." Millard returned to the restaurant the next day where she met Guy Savoy and gave him her resume. Savoy hired Millard to work at one of his satellite bistros, where she worked for five years. Later, she worked for Daniel Patterson at Coi in San Francisco and helped him open Plum, his restaurant in Oakland, California. Millard's husband and co-owner, Ksandek Podbielski was also born in a small town in West Germany where his mother was a school teacher and his father was serving in the United States Army. He later returned to the United States, eventually moving to Oregon and working at a vineyard, where he managed the winery's hospitality department. Podbielski soon began working in restaurants as well.

In 2012, Millard and Podbielski started a pop-up restaurant series called the Coquine Supper Club at Dancing Roots Farm in Troutdale, Oregon, wineries, and special events. Millard and Podbielski opened Coquine in July 2015 serving only dinner and expecting to operate primarily as a coffee shop. On August 7, 2015, Coquine began serving counter service lunch and breakfast.

In July 2017, Coquine began serving full service lunch.

Reception
In 2015, its opening year, Coquine was named Restaurant of the Year by Eater Portland and Katy Millard was nominated for Chef of the Year. Coquine was also a finalist in the 2016 James Beard Foundation Awards and was named one of Bon Appétit's top fifty "best new restaurants". The Oregonian named Coquine the 2016 Restaurant of the Year. In 2017, 2018, 2019, and 2020, Katy Millard was nominated by the James Beard Foundation for Best Chef: Northwest.
In October 2021, Coquine was listed in the New York Times' 2021 Restaurant List as one of "50 places in America we're most excited about right now."

See also

 List of French restaurants

References

2015 establishments in Oregon
French restaurants in Portland, Oregon
Mount Tabor, Portland, Oregon
Restaurants established in 2015